
Year 377 BC was a year of the pre-Julian Roman calendar. At the time, it was known as the Year of the Tribunate of Mamercinus, Poplicola, Cicurinus, Rufus (or Praetextatus), Cincinnatus and Cincinnatus (or, less frequently, year 377 Ab urbe condita). The denomination 377 BC for this year has been used since the early medieval period, when the Anno Domini calendar era became the prevalent method in Europe for naming years.

Events 
 By place 

 Persian Empire 
 Mausolus is appointed as the Persian satrap of Caria.

 Greece 
 Timotheus wins over the Acarnanians and Molossians as friends of Athens.
 Athens, in preparing for participation in the Spartan-Theban struggle, reorganises its finances and its taxation, inaugurating a system whereby the richer citizens are responsible for the collection of taxes from the less rich.
 The Peace of Antalcidas (387 BC), includes a clause guaranteeing the Greek cities their independence. The Spartan King Agesilaus II uses this clause as an excuse to force the dissolution of Thebes' Boeotian League. In two sieges, he reduces Thebes to near starvation.

Births

Deaths

References